Aldeby railway station was a station in Aldeby, in the English county of Norfolk. It was on the line between Great Yarmouth and Beccles; the station was opened in 1854 when the line from Ipswich to Beccles was extended northwards. It was closed in 1959.

History

Opened by the East Suffolk Railway, it subsequently joined the Great Eastern Railway, it became part of the London and North Eastern Railway during the Grouping of 1923. The line then passed on to the Eastern Region of British Railways on nationalisation in 1948. It was then closed by the British Transport Commission.

Present day
The former railway bridge is still visible on Station Road. 
There is a large building on the station site and the former course of the railway can be tracked through the fields.
As at 2008, the goods yard is now a used car dealership and scrap yard, and as previously noted has several large buildings on the site.
The station house is mainly unchanged in outward appearance but is now a private house.

References

External links
 Aldeby station on 1946 O. S. map

Disused railway stations in Norfolk
Former Great Eastern Railway stations
Railway stations in Great Britain opened in 1854
Railway stations in Great Britain closed in 1959
1854 establishments in England
1959 disestablishments in England